Ctenobethylus is an extinct genus of ants in the subfamily Dolichoderinae. The genus contains a single described species Ctenobethylus goepperti, where the fossil is known to be from the Baltic Amber. The fossil contained a preserved mesostigmatid mite attached to the head of the ant, which is perhaps the oldest known evidence of ecological association between mites and ants.

References

†
Monotypic fossil ant genera
Fossil taxa described in 1868
Fossil taxa described in 1939
Prehistoric insects of Europe
Eocene insects